Gilbert Heathcote-Drummond-Willoughby, 2nd Earl of Ancaster  (29 July 1867 – 19 September 1951), known as Lord Willoughby de Eresby from 1892 to 1910, was a British Conservative politician.

Early life
Ancaster was born in London on 29 July 1867.  He was the eldest son of Gilbert Henry Heathcote-Drummond-Willoughby, 1st Earl of Ancaster, and Lady Evelyn Elizabeth Gordon, daughter of Charles Gordon, 10th Marquess of Huntly.

He was educated at Lambrook Preparatory School and at Eton, where he was editor of the Eton College Chronicle and president of the Eton Society. He then attended Trinity College, Cambridge.

Career
In 1894, he was elected to Parliament for the Horncastle Division of Lincolnshire, a seat he held until shortly after the December 1910 general election, when he succeeded his father as second Earl of Ancaster and entered the House of Lords. Ancaster later held office as Parliamentary Secretary to the Ministry of Agriculture and Fisheries under David Lloyd George from 1921 to 1922 and under Bonar Law and Stanley Baldwin from 1922 to 1924.

Apart from his parliamentary political career he was also Lord Lieutenant of Rutland from 1921 to 1951, Chairman of Rutland County Council from 1922 to 1937, DL for the county of Perthshire and JP for Lincolnshire, where he was Chairman of the Kesteven Quarter Sessions from 1911 to 1937.

He was Joint Lord Great Chamberlain between 1910 and 1951.  He was appointed GCVO in 1937.

During the Second Boer War he was appointed an honorary Major of the Leicestershire Imperial Yeomanry, but was in June 1901 transferred to become Captain of the Lincolnshire Imperial Yeomanry, rising to Lieutenant-Colonel.

On 12 December 1902 he was one of the founding directors of Ivel Agricultural Motors Limited of Biggleswade, founded by Dan Albone who had invented the Ivel Agricultural Motor (the word 'tractor' did not come into common use until later).

Personal life
In 1905, Lord Aveland married American heiress Eloise Lawrence Breese (1882–1953), daughter of William Lawrence Breese of New York, at St Margaret's, Westminster. Her sister Anne married Lord Alastair Robert Innes-Ker, the second son of James Innes-Ker, 7th Duke of Roxburghe.  Lord Alastair's brother, Henry Innes-Ker, 8th Duke of Roxburghe, also married an American, Mary Goelet. Eloise and Anne's brother, William L. Breese Jr., was married to Julia Kean Fish, daughter of U.S. Representative Hamilton Fish II. Together, Eloise and Gilbert were the parents of two sons and two daughters:

 Lady Catherine Mary Heathcote-Drumond-Willoughby (1906–1996), who married Charles Wedderburn Hume and John St Maur Ramsden (1902–1948), son of Sir John Ramsden, 6th Baronet.
 Gilbert James Heathcote-Drumond-Willoughby (1907–1983), who married the Hon. Nancy Phyllis Louise Astor, daughter of Waldorf Astor, 2nd Viscount Astor.
 Lady Priscilla Heathcote-Drumond-Willoughby (1909–2002), who married Col. Sir John Aird, 3rd Baronet (parents of Sir John Aird, 4th Baronet).
 John Heathcote-Drumond-Willoughby (1914–1970), who died unmarried.

He died on 19 September 1951, aged 84, and was succeeded in his titles by his only surviving son, Gilbert James Heathcote-Drummond-Willoughby. His widow died in 1953.

References

External links

1867 births
1951 deaths
26
Alumni of Trinity College, Cambridge
Heathcote-Drummond-Willoughby, Gilbert
Gilbert
Gilbert
Lord-Lieutenants of Rutland
Heathcote-Drummond-Willoughby, Gilbert
Heathcote-Drummond-Willoughby, Gilbert
Heathcote-Drummond-Willoughby, Gilbert
Heathcote-Drummond-Willoughby, Gilbert
Heathcote-Drummond-Willoughby, Gilbert
Heathcote-Drummond-Willoughby, Gilbert
UK MPs who inherited peerages
Deputy Lieutenants of Perthshire
Leicestershire Yeomanry officers
Lincolnshire Yeomanry officers
English justices of the peace
People educated at Eton College